Mammal Species of the World: A Taxonomic and Geographic Reference is a standard reference work in mammalogy giving descriptions and bibliographic data for the known species of mammals. It is now in its third edition, published in late 2005, which was edited by Don E. Wilson and DeeAnn M. Reeder.

An online version is hosted by Bucknell University, from which the names of the species can be downloaded as a custom dictionary. A partial online version is available at Google Books (see "External links" below).

The Checklist Committee is charged with compiling and updating MSW. In its Annual Report for 2015, the Committee noted that it is under contract with Johns Hopkins Press for the 4th edition of MSW, which will be edited by DeeAnn M. Reeder and Kristofer M. Helgen. The database has been made editable for the authors, leading to more frequent website updates. The publication was scheduled for 2019.

References

External links

Site hosted by Bucknell University
search hosted by Bucknell University
taxon browser on archived version of the Smithsonian website for MSW3
Mammal Species of the World at Google Books

Mammalogical literature
Online taxonomy databases
Zoology books